Torsvik is a Norwegian surname. Notable people with the surname include:

Chand Torsvik (born 1982), Norwegian singer
Per Torsvik (1925–1998), Norwegian political scientist and media scholar
Trond Helge Torsvik
Solveig Torsvik (born 1954), Norwegian politician

Norwegian-language surnames